Freddy Waldo Flores is a film actor. He works in the cinema of Argentina.

Filmography
 Bolivia (2001)
 Un Oso rojo (2002)
 Tenemos un problema, Ernesto (2014)
 Tríada (2016)

Award nomination
 Argentine Film Critics Association Awards: Silver Condor; Best New Actor for Bolivia; 2001.

References

External links
 
 

21st-century Argentine male actors
Argentine male film actors
Living people
Year of birth missing (living people)
Place of birth missing (living people)